Matthew Phillip Gelso (born July 18, 1988) is an American cross-country skier. He was born in Truckee, California.

He represented US at the FIS Nordic World Ski Championships 2015 in Falun.

References

External links 
 

1988 births
Living people
American male cross-country skiers
21st-century American people